The Vespi Tower is a skyscraper office building completed in 1998 in Cianjin District, Kaohsiung, Taiwan.

See also
 List of tallest buildings in Asia
 List of tallest buildings in Taiwan
 List of tallest buildings in Kaohsiung

References

1998 establishments in Taiwan
Office buildings completed in 1998
Skyscraper office buildings in Kaohsiung